Metropolis of Kiev is an episcopal title that has been created with varying suffixes at multiple times in different Christian churches, though always maintaining the name of the metropolitan city — Kiev (Kyiv) — which today is located in the modern state of Ukraine. Following the Council of Florence and the Union of Brest, there are now parallel apostolic successions: in the Russian Orthodox Church, the Orthodox Church of Ukraine, the Ruthenian Uniate Church and its successors. They include:
 Metropolis of Kiev and all Rus' (988–1441)
 Metropolis of Kiev, Galicia and all Rus' (1441 - 1596)
 Metropolis of Kiev, Galicia and all Ruthenia (Ruthenian Uniate Church) (1595–1805)
 Metropolis of Kiev, Galicia and all Rus' - the metropolis of the Eastern Orthodox Church that was re-established in the Polish–Lithuanian Commonwealth (1620–1686)
 Metropolitanate of Kyiv
 Ukrainian Catholic Major Archeparchy of Kyiv–Galicia (2005–present) 
 Ukrainian Catholic Archeparchy of Kyiv (2005–to present)
 List of metropolitans and patriarchs of Kyiv